Tupaliče is a village south of Preddvor in the Upper Carniola region of Slovenia.

The local church is dedicated to Saint Clement. It is a Romanesque building with a Baroque sanctuary and a later belfry. Frescos in the nave date to ca. 1400 and there are 16th-century images of Saint Christopher and of the Crucifixion of Jesus on the south exterior wall.

References

External links
Tupaliče at Geopedia.si

Populated places in the Municipality of Preddvor